José Manuel Martins Dominguez (born 16 February 1974) is a Portuguese former footballer who played as a winger, and a later became a manager.

A diminutive player with above-average technical skills and speed, he started playing professional football not in his own country but in England with Birmingham City. After two years with Sporting, he returned to England for three years with Tottenham Hotspur, then spent another three with German club 1. FC Kaiserslautern and had short spells in Qatar and Brazil.

Dominguez was one of the shortest players to have ever played in the Premier League.

Club career

Early years and Sporting
Born in Lisbon, Dominguez had an unassuming youth spell at hometown club S.L. Benfica, then played for a year with amateurs S.U. Sintrense also in the area. After a few months at AD Fafe he had his first taste of professional football, joining Football League Second Division club Birmingham City in March 1994 and being relegated in his first season.

Following Luís Figo's departure to FC Barcelona, Sporting CP chose Dominguez as his replacement, and he went on to spend two solid seasons with the latter side, albeit with no silverware.

Tottenham Hotspur
Tottenham Hotspur, coached by Gerry Francis, returned Dominguez to England in August 1997, for £1.6 million. He made his debut in the Premier League against Derby County at the end of that month, winning a penalty after coming on as a second-half substitute; however, despite being at White Hart Lane for over three years, his appearances were limited: he started regularly under Francis, but came more regularly off the bench during Christian Gross's tenure as manager.

Dominguez won the 1998–99 League Cup with Spurs as an unused substitute in the final, but fell out of favour during the following season under George Graham, who demoted him to the reserves. He only played two league matches for the first team, both as substitute.

Late career
Dominguez signed for 1. FC Kaiserslautern in November 2000, for £250,000. He scored in only his second Bundesliga game, a 4–2 loss at Bayer Leverkusen, but his performances were also irregular; in his last season he scored one goal in 26 matches, but the team finished just one place above relegation.

After a brief spell in Qatar with Al-Ahly Doha, Dominguez moved in 2005 to Brazil's CR Vasco da Gama. After only three starts in 11 competitive appearances, he was not offered a new contract and left, eventually retiring aged 31.

International career
While at Sporting, Dominguez won three caps for Portugal. In a more important role, he helped the Olympic team to a fourth-place finish at the 1996 Summer Olympics in Atlanta. That team also included four other Sporting graduates – Luís Andrade, Dani, Emílio Peixe and Hugo Porfírio.

Coaching career
Dominguez spent two years coaching U.D. Leiria's youth sides. On 14 March 2012 he became the first team's fourth coach of the campaign, replacing the fired Manuel Cajuda. In 2012–13 he worked with Sporting's reserves, in the Segunda Liga.

In late December 2013, Dominguez was appointed at Real Cartagena in Colombia as part of an agreement between that club and Sporting. On 24 March 2015, he was named at the helm of Recreativo de Huelva, replacing Juan Manuel Pavón. He remained at the club after their relegation to Segunda División B and was dismissed on 12 October, having won two and drawn three of the first eight games of the season.

In early 2021, Dominguez joined Sa Pinto at Gaziantep FK as an assistant coach.

References

External links

1974 births
Living people
Footballers from Lisbon
Portuguese footballers
Association football wingers
Primeira Liga players
Segunda Divisão players
S.L. Benfica footballers
S.U. Sintrense players
AD Fafe players
Sporting CP footballers
Premier League players
English Football League players
Birmingham City F.C. players
Tottenham Hotspur F.C. players
Bundesliga players
1. FC Kaiserslautern players
Qatar Stars League players
Al Ahli SC (Doha) players
Campeonato Brasileiro Série A players
CR Vasco da Gama players
Portugal under-21 international footballers
Portugal international footballers
Olympic footballers of Portugal
Footballers at the 1996 Summer Olympics
Portuguese expatriate footballers
Expatriate footballers in England
Expatriate footballers in Germany
Expatriate footballers in Qatar
Expatriate footballers in Brazil
Portuguese expatriate sportspeople in England
Portuguese expatriate sportspeople in Germany
Portuguese expatriate sportspeople in Qatar
Portuguese expatriate sportspeople in Brazil
Portuguese football managers
Primeira Liga managers
Liga Portugal 2 managers
U.D. Leiria managers
Sporting CP B managers
Segunda División managers
Segunda División B managers
Recreativo de Huelva managers
Portuguese expatriate football managers
Expatriate football managers in Colombia
Expatriate football managers in Spain
Portuguese expatriate sportspeople in Spain